Ya'akov Gil (born Ya'akov Gila; 17 January 1931 – 21 January 2007) was an Israeli politician who served as a member of the Knesset for the Alignment during the 1980s.

Biography
Born in Jerusalem, Gil was educated at Beit Alpha, before studying social work at the Hebrew University of Jerusalem. A member of Hashomer Hatzair and joined kibbutz Megiddo in 1952, but left two years later. He worked for Jerusalem City Council from until 1983.

In 1964 he joined Mapai. He later became a member of the Labor Party's Jerusalem executive, and chaired the youth section of the party's central committee. In 1981 he was elected to the Knesset on the Alignment list. He lost his seat in the 1984 elections, but returned to the Knesset on 15 March 1988 as a replacement for Simcha Dinitz. However, he lost his seat again in the November 1988 elections.

He died in 2007 at the age of 76.

References

External links
 

1931 births
2007 deaths
People from Jerusalem
Hashomer Hatzair members
Alignment (Israel) politicians
Israeli Labor Party politicians
Mapai politicians
Members of the 10th Knesset (1981–1984)
Members of the 11th Knesset (1984–1988)